Ian MacLean (born August 13, 1966 in Paisley, Scotland) is a former footballer.

Club career
MacLean played for Seattle Storm, Portland Timbers, Bristol Rovers, Cardiff City and Rotherham United.

International career
Although born in Scotland, MacLean has represented Canada 3 times. His international debut was against Portugal in a SkyDome Cup match in Toronto on January 26, 1995, in a 1–1 draw, playing for 45 minutes. On June 4, 1995, he played for 30 minutes in a friendly which Turkey won 3–1. On August 3, 1995, MacLean made his third and final appearance for the national side in a 3–1 win over Trinidad and Tobago in a Caribana Cup match, also in Toronto.

References

External links

Football League player database

1966 births
Living people
Footballers from Paisley, Renfrewshire
Scottish emigrants to Canada
Association football defenders
Canadian soccer players
Canadian expatriate soccer players
Canada men's international soccer players
Seattle Storm (soccer) players
Portland Timbers (1985–1990) players
Bristol Rovers F.C. players
Cardiff City F.C. players
Rotherham United F.C. players
Western Soccer Alliance players
American Professional Soccer League players
English Football League players
Canadian expatriate sportspeople in the United States
Expatriate soccer players in the United States
Canadian expatriate sportspeople in England
Canadian expatriate sportspeople in Wales